Patrick William Sykes (3 March 1925 in Vancouver, British Columbia, Canada - 14 January 2014) was an England international rugby union footballer. He was educated at St John's School, Leatherhead and made his England debut on 29 March 1948 against France. In total he played 7 times for England.

References

1925 births
Canadian people of English descent
Canadian rugby union players
England international rugby union players
English people of Canadian descent
English rugby union players
2014 deaths
Sportspeople from Vancouver
People educated at St John's School, Leatherhead
Rugby union scrum-halves